Obuchi is a Japanese surname 小渕. Notable people with the surname include:

Keizo Obuchi (1937–2000), Japanese politician
Yūko Obuchi (born 1973), Japanese politician, daughter of Keizo
Raiju Obuchi (born 2003), Japanese association footballer

Japanese-language surnames